David Henry Mercer (July 9, 1857 – January 10, 1919) was an American Republican Party politician.

Born in Benton County, Iowa on July 9, 1857, he moved with his parents to Adams County, Illinois in 1858. After the American Civil War he moved again to Brownville, Nebraska. He graduated from the University of Nebraska-Lincoln in 1880 and the law department of University of Michigan in Ann Arbor, Michigan in 1882. He was admitted to the bar and set up practice back in Brownville serving one term as city clerk and police judge.

He moved to Omaha, Nebraska in 1885 and was for several years was chairman of the Republican city and county committees. He was the secretary of the Republican State central committee in 1896 and elected secretary of the Republican National Congressional Committee in the same year. In 1897 he was chairman of the Republican State Central committee of Nebraska in 1897 and 1898.

He was elected as a Republican to the Fifty-third United States Congress and to the four succeeding Congresses serving from March 4, 1893, to March 3, 1903. During his time as representatives, he was chairman of the U.S. House Committee on Public Buildings and Grounds during the Fifty-fifth, Fifty-sixth, and Fifty-seventh Congresses. He unsuccessfully ran for reelection in 1902. Afterwards, he settled in Washington, D.C. resuming his practice of law. He died in Omaha on January 10, 1919, and is buried in Forest Lawn Cemetery, in Omaha.

References
 
 
 
 

1857 births
1919 deaths
Nebraska lawyers
University of Nebraska–Lincoln alumni
University of Michigan Law School alumni
Washington, D.C., Republicans
Republican Party members of the United States House of Representatives from Nebraska
19th-century American politicians
People from Benton County, Iowa
People from Adams County, Illinois
People from Brownville, Nebraska
Politicians from Omaha, Nebraska
19th-century American lawyers